Closter is a surname. Notable people with the surname include:

Al Closter (born 1943), American baseball player
René Closter (born 1952), Luxembourgian businessman
Sebastián Closter (born 1989), Argentine volleyball player
Wayne Closter (born 1945), Australian rules footballer